Mine is the second studio album of Chinese singer Li Yuchun, released on November 2, 2007 by Taihe Rye. The album was re-released in 2008 to celebrate Chinese New Year.

Track listing
Chinese song titles in the notes field

Music videos
My Kingdom 
Floating Subway 
Stop

References

External links
 Mine on Discogs

2007 albums
Chinese-language albums
Li Yuchun albums